, previously  and also called , is a large greenspace in Lyon situated on a former industrial site in the south of the city near the confluence of the Rhône and the Saone. The initial two phases of construction concluded in 2000 and 2006, and were carried out by landscape architect . The project was managed by Grand Lyon. The park was renamed to Parc Henry-Chabert on 19 December 2020.

The park includes several playgrounds, a skatepark and a botanical garden. It is situated next to the Stade de Gerland, and was used during the French archery championship finals in 2007 and 2012.

See also 
 Parc de la Tête d'or
 Parc de Parilly
 Parc Sergent Blandan
 Parks in Lyon

References

External links 

 Official website 
 Grand Lyon official website for Parc de Gerland 

Parks in Lyon
7th arrondissement of Lyon
2000 establishments in France